Co-operative Insurance Cup may refer to:
Scottish League Cup (2008–11)
Irish League Cup (2001–11)